Lyra is a 2022 British film about the life and death of murdered Northern Irish author and journalist Lyra McKee, directed by Alison Millar. The film repurposes voice recordings and interviews from McKee's dictaphone, as well as uses text messages, home movie footage and other archives. Lyra premiered on 7 November 2021 at Belfast and Cork film festivals.

The film won the Tim Hetherington award at Sheffield DocFest and the audience award at the Cork International Film Festival.

References

External links

2022 independent films
British documentary films
2020s English-language films
2020s British films